Gibberula delarrochae is a species of sea snail, a marine gastropod mollusk, in the family Cystiscidae. It is named after Spanish pianist Alicia de Larrocha.

Description
The length of the shell attains 2.2 mm.

Distribution
This marine species occurs off Guadeloupe.

References

delarrochae
Gastropods described in 2015